Peter Huba (born February 17, 1986) is a Slovak professional ice hockey player who currently plays for Újpesti TE of the Erste Liga.

Huba played in the Slovak Extraliga for HC Slovan Bratislava, HKm Zvolen, HC Košice and HC '05 Banská Bystrica.

Career statistics

References

1986 births
Living people
HC '05 Banská Bystrica players
HC 07 Detva players
Dunaújvárosi Acélbikák players
HC Košice players
HC Nové Zámky players
Sportspeople from Topoľčany
Slovak ice hockey defencemen
HC Slovan Bratislava players
Újpesti TE (ice hockey) players
HKM Zvolen players
Expatriate ice hockey players in Hungary
Slovak expatriate ice hockey people
Slovak expatriate sportspeople in Hungary